Route 28A, or Highway 28A, may refer to:

Canada
 Alberta Highway 28A

India
  National Highway 28A (India)

United States
 Massachusetts Route 28A
M-28A (Michigan highway) (former)
 New Hampshire Route 28A
 County Route 28A (Monmouth County, New Jersey)
 New York State Route 28A
 County Route 28A (Columbia County, New York)
 County Route 28A (St. Lawrence County, New York)
 Oklahoma State Highway 28A